Palace of Independence or Independence Palace may refer to:

 Independence Palace, Ho Chi Minh City, Vietnam
 Independence Palace, Minsk, Belarus
 Palace of Independence (Nur-Sultan), Kazakhstan
 , Lisbon, Portugal
 Saigon Governor's Palace, later renamed Independence Palace

See also
 Independence (disambiguation)
 Independence Building, several structures
 Independence Hall (disambiguation)
 Palace (disambiguation)